Chan-Kin Flora and Fauna Protection Area is a protected natural area in southeastern Mexico. Chan-Kin is located in the Lacandon Forest of eastern Chiapas state. It lies just west of the Usumacinta River, and east of the Lacan-Tun and Montes Azules biosphere reserves. The flora and fauna protection area was established in 1992 by the Mexican government, and covers an area of 121.85 km2.

References

Flora and fauna protection areas of Mexico
Protected areas of Chiapas
Petén–Veracruz moist forests